Adrian Rodney Quaife-Hobbs (born 3 February 1991) is a British racing driver, notable for being the youngest driver to win the T Cars championship and the youngest ever winner of a MSA-sanctioned car racing series. He currently resides in Tonbridge.

Career

Early career
Quaife-Hobbs was born in Pembury. He began his career in 2002, racing in the Honda cadets category, winning four races in his first season and coming second in the Formula 6 Championship. 2003 saw Quaife-Hobbs move up to the more powerful Mini Max category where he took several podium finishes and a race victory. Quaife-Hobbs continued racing in the Mini Max series for 2004, winning the Bayford Meadows Championship. At the age of 14, Quaife-Hobbs moved up to the T Cars category where he won both the main T Cars Championship title, becoming the youngest Champion in the series' history at 14 years 8 months old, and winning the Autumn Trophy title as well. In 2006 Quaife-Hobbs competed in the first few T-car races and got a double win in the opening rounds and also won his last race at Rockingham before deciding to focus on a 2007 campaign in Formula BMW. 2006 also saw Quaife-Hobbs win the British Racing Drivers' Club's Rising Star Award, becoming the youngest driver to receive the award at the age of fifteen.

Formula BMW
For 2007, Quaife-Hobbs was promoted to the Formula BMW class, running in its UK series, racing for the current Champions Fortec Motorsport. The young Brit established himself in the first meeting of the championship at Brands Hatch, coming eleventh on his debut and running in third for a majority of the second race before tyre issues forced him to yield the final podium place to Valle Mäkelä, the winner of race one. Quaife-Hobbs finished his debut season tenth in the Drivers' Championship with 405 points.

Formula Renault
Following the closure of the 2007 FBMW UK season, Quaife-Hobbs decided to enter the Formula Renault Eurocup with BVM Minardi to gain experience in the Formula Renault cars. He did well on his debut, despite retiring in the first race, he finished eighth in the second from thirteenth position, enough to earn him three points. Quaife-Hobbs also competed in two Formula Renault NEC races with Motopark Academy and at Spa, he got his first Formula Renault podium in only his third event. 2007 also saw Quaife-Hobbs win a place on the prestigious MSA British Race Elite scheme run by David Brabham.

Quaife-Hobbs entered the Eurocup for a full season in 2008 as well as the Italian championship, both with the BVM Minardi team in which he finished fourth. He returned to Motopark Academy for 2009 campaigns in the Eurocup and Northern European Cup, finishing fourth in both series.

Formula Three

Quaife-Hobbs stepped up into the Formula 3 Euro Series for the 2010 season, staying with Motopark Academy for his graduation into the series. He earned points in first races of the Circuit Paul Ricard and Hockenheim meetings, finishing sixth and fifth respectively.

GP3 Series
After the Euro Series opener, Quaife-Hobbs elected to concentrate on the new-for-2010 GP3 Series, signing a contract with Manor Racing. At Spa he secured his first podium. He finished in fifteenth position in the championship standings.

Quaife-Hobbs stayed in GP3 for 2011 with Manor. He achieved his first win at Valencia. At the end of the season he improved to fifth position in the drivers' championship, and as he finished as the best-placed Marussia Manor driver in the championship, he received a Formula One test with Marussia Virgin Racing.

Auto GP World Series
In 2012 Quaife-Hobbs graduated to the Auto GP World Series, competing for Super Nova International. Since the start of the season, he has taken victory in Monza and Valencia, notching up two pole positions, five podium finishes from six rounds and currently leads the series by 29 points.

He went on to take every pole bar one throughout the season, and took the championship.

GP2 Series
For 2013 Quaife-Hobbs was signed to race for MP Motorsport in the GP2 Series. The highlight of the first half of the season was a second place at Monaco, before he switched to Hilmer Motorsport from Hungary onwards. Following a second podium in Belgium, Quaife-Hobbs scored his maiden GP2 victory at Monza in the sprint race. He finished the season 13th overall, with a total of 56 points and one win.

For 2014, Quaife-Hobbs remained in GP2, but drove for the Rapax Team alongside Simon Trummer. For the second season in a row he finished the year in 13th position in the championship standings.

GT3
For the 2015 season, Quaife-Hobbs moved into endurance racing with the Von Ryan Racing team. He contested selected rounds of the Blancpain Endurance Series and British GT Championship, driving a McLaren 650S in the GT3 class. On his début in the British series, Quaife-Hobbs and his co-driver, Gilles Vannelet, took victory in the Silverstone 500.

Racing record

Career summary

Complete Formula 3 Euro Series results
(key)

Complete GP3 Series results
(key) (Races in bold indicate pole position) (Races in italics indicate fastest lap)

Complete Auto GP World Series results
(key) (Races in bold indicate pole position) (Races in italics indicate fastest lap)

† Driver retired, but was classified as they completed 90% of the winner's race distance.

Complete GP2 Series results
(key) (Races in bold indicate pole position) (Races in italics indicate fastest lap)

Complete British GT Championship results
(key) (Races in bold indicate pole position) (Races in italics indicate fastest lap)

References

External links
 
 

1991 births
Living people
People from Pembury
English racing drivers
Formula Renault 2.0 NEC drivers
Italian Formula Renault 2.0 drivers
Formula Renault Eurocup drivers
Portuguese Formula Renault 2.0 drivers
Formula BMW UK drivers
Formula 3 Euro Series drivers
GP3 Series drivers
Auto GP drivers
GP2 Series drivers
Blancpain Endurance Series drivers
24 Hours of Spa drivers
British GT Championship drivers
Manor Motorsport drivers
Super Nova Racing drivers
MP Motorsport drivers
Hilmer Motorsport drivers
Rapax Team drivers
Motopark Academy drivers
BVM Racing drivers
Fortec Motorsport drivers
Le Mans Cup drivers